Rory Brennan (born 1994) is a Gaelic footballer who plays for the Trillick club and the Tyrone county team.

Honours
Tyrone
 All-Ireland Senior Football Championship (1): 2021 
 Ulster Senior Football Championship (3): 2016, 2017, 2021
 All-Ireland Under-21 Football Championship (1): 2015
 Ulster Under-21 Football Championship (1): 2015
 Ulster Minor Football Championship (1): 2012

St Michael's College
 MacRory Cup (1): 2012 (c)

Trillick
 Tyrone Senior Football Championship (2): 2015, 2019

References

Living people
Gaelic football backs
Tyrone inter-county Gaelic footballers
1994 births